Caldbeck is a civil parish in the Borough of Allerdale in Cumbria, England.  It contains 79 listed buildings that are recorded in the National Heritage List for England.  Of these, one is listed at Grade I, the highest of the three grades, one is at Grade II*, the middle grade, and the others are at Grade II, the lowest grade.  The parish contains the villages of Caldbeck and Hesket Newmarket, and is otherwise mainly rural.  Most of the listed buildings are houses and associated structures, or farmhouses and farm buildings, in the villages and the surrounding countryside.  The other listed buildings include a church, former industrial buildings, a former moot hall and a market cross, a public house, and bridges.


Key

Buildings

Notes and references

Notes

Citations

Sources

Lists of listed buildings in Cumbria